Wayne Randle (born 1964) is a British former cyclist.

Cycling career
Randle represented England and won a bronze medal in the team time trial, at the 1990 Commonwealth Games in Auckland, New Zealand. He also competed in the road race where he finished in seventh place. He turned professional in 1993.

References

1964 births
Living people
British male cyclists
Commonwealth Games medallists in cycling
Commonwealth Games bronze medallists for England
Cyclists at the 1990 Commonwealth Games
Medallists at the 1990 Commonwealth Games